Hunting Eichmann: How a Band of Survivors and a Young Spy Agency Chased Down the World's Most Notorious Nazi is a book by Neal Bascomb. It chronicles the efforts to capture Adolf Eichmann, a top official in the SS during World War II and one of the major organizers of the Holocaust, in the years following the war. A network of concentration camp survivors and Nazi hunters in Europe, including Simon Wiesenthal, pursued leads on Eichmann's whereabouts and passed information to the government of Israel and its foreign intelligence agency, Mossad. A team of agents from both Mossad and Shin Bet (Israeli internal security) traveled to Buenos Aires, Argentina, where Eichmann was hiding, and captured him in May 1960. He was taken to Israel, tried and convicted of war crimes in 1961, and executed by hanging in June 1962.

External links
Hunting Eichmann on Goodreads
After Words interview with Bascomb on Hunting Eichmann, April 11, 2009

2009 non-fiction books
American biographies
Works about Adolf Eichmann